Jochem Jansen (born 4 January 1990) is a Dutch professional footballer who plays for Hoofdklasse club DUNO.

Career

De Graafschap
Jansen progressed through the youth teams of Concordia-Wehl before being scouted to the academy of De Graafschap in 2000. He made his professional debut on 4 December 2009 in a 3–0 win over Veendam, coming on as a late substitute for Cerezo Fung a Wing. That season, the club managed to win the Eerste Divisie title and promote to the Eredivisie, as Jansen mostly played for the reserves where he was team captain. In April 2011, Jansen signed a contract extension with De Graafschap until 2013.

FC Oss
On 2 September 2013, Jansen moved to FC Oss after his contract with De Graafschap had expired. He suffered a concussion in January 2014, after his teammate Marcel van der Sloot had accidentally shot a ball at the back of his head during practice. This sidelined him for the rest of the season. In May 2015, he signed a contract extension until 2017. He became team captain during his stint with Oss.

FC Roskilde
On 4 August 2017, Jansen signed with Danish 1st Division club FC Roskilde. He made his debut on two days later in a 3–2 home loss to Thisted FC, but suffered a serious knee injury after only 11 minutes on the pitch. He made his comeback on 11 October in a 3–1 away win over HB Køge, coming on as a substitute for Nicklas Mouritsen in the 76th minute. These appearances would remain his only games for the club.

DUNO
Jansen moved to VV DUNO in the Eerste Klasse on 2 March 2018. A few months later, he won promotion to the Hoofdklasse with the team.

Honours
De Graafschap
 Eerste Divisie: 2009–10

DUNO
 Eerste Klasse Saturday C – South: 2017–18

References

External links
 
 Voetbal International profile 

Living people
1990 births
People from Zevenaar
Association football defenders
Dutch footballers
Dutch expatriate footballers
De Graafschap players
TOP Oss players
FC Roskilde players
VV DUNO players
Eredivisie players
Eerste Divisie players
Danish 1st Division players
Eerste Klasse players
Vierde Divisie players
Expatriate men's footballers in Denmark
Dutch expatriate sportspeople in Denmark
Footballers from Gelderland
21st-century Dutch people